Slam City with Scottie Pippen is the first FMV basketball video game. It was developed by Digital Pictures for the PC and CD-ROM-based video game consoles such as the Sega CD. Scottie Pippen stars in the game, and performed the theme song. Ron Stein, who had previously directed the video footage for Prize Fighter, directed the video footage for the game. A 3DO Interactive Multiplayer version was announced but never released.

In the game, players face various opponents in one-on-one games of basketball, including Pippen himself.

The game allowed full screen video playback of low resolution MPEG video without specialized hardware utilizing video compression technology that Digital Pictures dubbed "Digichrome". Lag free on-screen selection was accomplished through a disc layout and buffering technology the company called "Instaswitch".

Reception

GamePro gave the Sega CD version a negative review. Though they remarked that the video footage is of the same high quality as that in Prize Fighter, they felt that it becomes repetitive too quickly, with players limited to a small, crude selection of moves that yield the same video clips over and over. They also complained of extremely inaccurate controls. Next Generation, in contrast, said the game proved that full-motion video games have potential. They commented that "there's still a problem with consistency (opponents have a bad habit of instantly breaking by for a dunk even when they appear to be a good 10 feet away), and the control isn't what it could be, but overall, it's solid entertainment, and basketball fans will love it." The two sports reviewers of Electronic Gaming Monthly both gave it a 7 out of 10, remarking that the game is dauntingly difficult but ultimately fun, with excellent video sequences.

The two sports reviewers of Electronic Gaming Monthly gave the 32X version scores of 5 and 6 out of 10, this time finding the game's difficulty more vexing. One of them echoed GamePros criticism of repetitive gameplay, while the other praised the full-motion video concept but said the game is too difficult to play. A different GamePro critic gave the 32X version a much more mixed review, criticizing the slow reaction time on the controls but praising the game's presentation, particularly the realistic trash talking and the vast improvement in graphics over the Sega CD version. Next Generation, however, felt this was insufficient justification for owning all three consoles required to play the game: "The 32X video and sound are slightly better than the Sega CD, but the 32X version loses a star for taking up too much room on your entertainment center for no good reason."

See also
Barkley Shut Up and Jam!
Michael Jordan: Chaos in the Windy City
Shaq Fu

References

External links

1994 video games
Basketball video games
Cancelled 3DO Interactive Multiplayer games
Interactive movie video games
Sega CD games
3DO Interactive Multiplayer games
Sega 32X games
Full motion video based games
Video games based on real people
Cultural depictions of basketball players
Cultural depictions of American men
Digital Pictures
Video games developed in the United States